The 2016 Green Party presidential primaries were a series of primaries, caucuses and state conventions in which voters elected delegates to represent a candidate for the Green Party's nominee for President of the United States at the 2016 Green National Convention. The primaries, held in numerous states on various dates from January to July 2016, featured elections publicly funded and held as an alternative ballot, concurrent with the Democratic and Republican primaries, and elections privately funded by the Green Party, held non-concurrently with the major party primaries. Over 400 delegates to the Green National Convention were elected in these primaries, with a candidate needing a simple majority of these delegates to become the party's nominee for president.

A total of six candidates stood in the primaries, including the preceding Green nominee for president in the 2012 presidential election, Jill Stein, who sought the nomination for a second time. Other candidates included Sedinam Moyowasifza-Curry, who had previously worked as a campaign manager for the presidential campaign of the Green Party's 2008 nominee, Cynthia McKinney, in addition to singer-songwriter and Earth First! activist Darryl Cherney, perennial candidate Kent Mesplay, University of South Carolina professor William Kreml, and youth rights activist Elijah Manley.

Formal recognition is a requirement to be the Green Party's nominee.  On May 4, the Green Party of the United States formally recognized William Kreml and Jill Stein as candidates for its presidential nomination.  On June 15, the Stein campaign announced that it had received 203 delegates, enough to win the nomination on the first ballot at the National Convention. Jill Stein formally won the nomination on August 6, during the 2016 Green National Convention

As the Green Party presidential candidate in the 2016 United States presidential election Stein received 1,457,222 votes or 1.06% of the popular vote. Stein received zero electoral college votes.

Background
The 2016 United States presidential election will be the fourth to be contested by the Green Party of the United States since they split from the Greens/Green Party USA (G/GPUSA) in 2001. The 2004 presidential election saw Green nominee David Cobb appear on ballots in 27 states plus the District of Columbia, and received 0.10% of the popular vote, losing out to many other candidates and parties on the ballot, including third-placed independent Ralph Nader, who had been the presidential nominee of the G/GPUSA in the 1996 and 2000 elections. In the 2008 election, Cynthia McKinney was nominated as the Green Party's candidate for the presidency and had ballot access to 32 states plus DC. However, McKinney insignificantly improved upon Cobb's performance, capturing only 0.12% of the popular vote in an election that also saw Nader finish a strong third behind the Democratic and Republican parties.

Having received minimal publicity in the previous elections, thus contributing to the low voting share that the party received, the Green Party gained significant exposure and media attention in the lead-up to the 2012 Green National Convention and the 2012 presidential election, starting with media personality Roseanne Barr's announcement of her presidential run with the Green Party. Using the publicity gained from the announcement, Barr praised the Green Party and championed their beliefs through interviews and public statements, which were often profane and harshly critical of both the Democratic and Republican parties. Barr, however, lost the nomination at the 2012 Green National Convention to physician and activist Jill Stein, who had gained the support of Green Party delegates through her "Green New Deal" platform of progressive economic policies centered on the prevention of future financial crisises and the acceleration of global warming. Stein's campaign for the presidency focused mostly on keeping the publicity gained by the Green Party and gaining support from independents and dissenting Democratic and Republican voters, often echoing resentment towards the two parties. This included a court challenge against the Commission on Presidential Debates by Stein that sought to include her in the official presidential election debates. Stein's campaign also gained media attention and exposure through a series of nonviolent protests, including those against the presidential debates, the Keystone XL pipeline, and foreclosures, which had Stein arrested, and even jailed, numerous times.

On election day, Stein oversaw a relatively sharp rise in the Green Party's popularity, earning 0.36% of the popular vote (469,628 votes), across the Green Party's ballot access in 36 states plus DC. The result was triple the amount Cynthia McKinney received in 2008, pushing the Green Party from a lower-tier third party to the second most popular third party, trailing behind the Libertarian Party, who had nominated the popular former Governor of New Mexico Gary Johnson as their presidential candidate, also setting numerous Libertarian Party and presidential third party records. The election also notably made Stein the most successful female presidential candidate in U.S. history, surpassing Lenora Fulani's bid for the presidency in the 1988 election, with the New Alliance Party, who had ballot access in all states plus DC and earned 217,219 votes that year. Despite her success, however, Stein's campaign was criticized by those who felt that she had failed to capitalise on her momentum and gain an even bigger success.

Candidates
The national Green Party of the United States officially recognized two candidates, Jill Stein and William Kreml, while four additional candidates have appeared on several state—or territory—ballots.

Debates

The Green Party of New Mexico and Students Organizing Action for Peace hosted a debate on April 9 at the University of New Mexico's Student Union Building. The debate was streamed online through Burque Media Productions. All five candidates recognized by the national party were invited.

Results

Map

See also

 Jill Stein presidential campaign, 2016

National Conventions
2016 Green National Convention
2016 Libertarian National Convention
2016 Republican National Convention
2016 Democratic National Convention

Presidential primaries
 Constitution Party presidential primaries, 2016
 Democratic Party presidential primaries, 2016
 Green Party presidential primaries, 2016
 Libertarian Party presidential primaries, 2016
 Republican Party presidential primaries, 2016

References